Riley Green is a hamlet, part of the civil parish of Hoghton, within the Borough of Chorley, Lancashire, England. It is located at the junction of the A675 and A6061 roads, between Preston, Blackburn and Chorley. The hamlet consists of a small number of houses and two pubs - the Royal Oak on the A6061, and the Boatyard on the A675 beside the Leeds and Liverpool Canal. Most of the surrounding area is pasture land. There is also a marina at The Boatyard, where many narrowboats are moored, and some are for hire, and there is a cruising restaurant. The original route to Hoghton Tower starts in Riley Green, however it is now only a track as a new route was built straight up to the Tower when motorised transport came to pass. The village is on the Blackburn Bus Company bus route from Burnley to Preston (route 152) and near junction 3 of the M65. Boats were formerly constructed at the Boat Yard in the village which the Boatyard pub is named after. The Boatyard was refurbished by the brewery Thwaites in 2016 and reopened as the Grill and Grain but was destroyed by fire in 2017.

References

External links

Hamlets in Lancashire
Hoghton